The following radio stations broadcast on FM frequency 102.7 MHz:

Argentina
 LT3 in Rosario, Santa Fe
 Radio María in Rawson, Chubut

Australia
 Sky Sports Radio in Jindabyne, New South Wales
 3RRR in Melbourne, Victoria
 4CCA in Cairns, Queensland
 4DDB in Toowoomba, Queensland
 ABC Classic FM in Mildura, Victoria
 ABC North and West SA in Roxby Downs, South Australia
 2RVR in Wagga Wagga, New South Wales
 Triple J in Rosebery, Tasmania

Belgium
 Topradio in Aalst, Flanders

Brazil
 ZYD 672 in Caxias do Sul, Rio Grande do Sul

Canada (Channel 274)
 CBH-FM in Halifax, Nova Scotia
 CBJE-FM in Chicoutimi, Quebec
 CBMS-FM in Blanc-Sablon, Quebec
 CBTF-FM in Falkland, British Columbia
 CFGI-FM in Georgina Island, Ontario
 CJFB-FM in Caledon, Ontario
 CFOA-FM in Algonquin Park, Ontario
 CFOA-FM-1 in Algonquin Park, Ontario
 CKPK-FM in Vancouver, British Columbia
 CHOP-FM in Newmarket, Ontario
 CILU-FM in Thunder Bay, Ontario
 CITE-FM-1 in Sherbrooke, Quebec
 CIWC-FM in Ucluelet, British Columbia
 CJFN-FM in Peguis, Manitoba
 CJMV-FM in Val-d'Or, Quebec
 CJRK-FM in Scarborough, Ontario 
 CKNH-FM in Norway House, Manitoba
 CKSB-6-FM in Dryden, Ontario
 VF2463 in Fort Alexander, Manitoba
 CKMS-FM in Waterloo, Ontario

China 
 CNR The Voice of China in Huanren

Ireland
 Spin South West in Limerick
 RTÉ Raidió na Gaeltachta in the Northeast

Mexico
 XEHL-FM in Guadalajara, Jalisco
 XHAC-FM in Campeche, Campeche
 XHCANQ-FM in Cancún (Santa Martha), Quintana Roo
 XHCHG-FM in Chilpancingo, Guerrero
 XHDM-FM in Hermosillo, Sonora
 XHGAS-FM in Cuatro Ciénegas, Coahuila
 XHHW-FM in Las Garzas, El Rosario, Sonora
 XHIRG-FM in Irapuato, Guanajuato
 XHJBT-FM in San Juan Bautista Tuxtepec, Oaxaca
 XHPQUI-FM in Tequisquiapan, Querétaro
 XHPR-FM in Poza Rica, Veracruz
 XHSCBJ-FM in Maravatio, Michoacan
 XHQT-FM in Nogales, Sonora
XHRCA-FM in Torreón, Coahuila
 XHTCH-FM in Tapachula, Chiapas

Netherlands
 Radio 538 in Rotterdam and Emmen

Philippines

DWSM in Metro Manila
DYES-FM in Cebu City
DXYP in Davao City
DXHT in Zamboanga City

Malaysia

IKIM in Ipoh, Perak, Penang and Seremban, Negeri Sembilan

South Africa
 Classic FM (South Africa) in Johannesburg

United States (Channel 274)
  in Van Buren, Arkansas
  in Manitou Springs, Colorado
 KBLZ in Winona, Texas
 KBYH-LP in Midland, Texas
 KCHW in Chewelah, Washington
 KCNA in Cave Junction, Oregon
 KDDB in Waipahu, Hawaii
 KGQD-LP in Kermit, Texas
  in Fresno, California
 KHXS in Merkel, Texas
 KHYX in Winnemucca, Nevada
 KIEV-LP in Camas, Washington
  in Los Angeles, California
 KINX in Fairfield, Montana
 KJNA-FM in Jena, Louisiana
 KJOK in Hollis, Oklahoma
 KJXK in San Antonio, Texas
  in Oklahoma City, Oklahoma
  in Liberal, Kansas
  in Citrus Heights, California
  in Thief River Falls, Minnesota
  in Richland, Washington
 KPGZ-LP in Kearney, Missouri
 KQHM in Zapata, Texas
  in Lake Ozark, Missouri
  in Juneau, Alaska
  in Midvale, Utah
 KTBH-FM in Kurtistown, Hawaii
  in Pequot Lakes, Minnesota
 KTXJ-FM in Jasper, Texas
 KVGS in Boulder City, Nevada
 KVSS (FM) in Papillion, Nebraska
  in North Crossett, Arkansas
 KWVF in Guerneville, California
  in Box Elder, South Dakota
 KYBB in Canton, South Dakota
 KYGT-LP in Idaho Springs, Colorado
  in Northwood, Iowa
 KYTE in Independence, Oregon
 KZMG in Melba, Idaho
 WAOR in Ligonier, Indiana
  in Trenton, Georgia
 WBOW in Terre Haute, Indiana
 WCGM in Clarendon, Pennsylvania
 WCHS-LP in Sylvester, Georgia
 WCKS in Fruithurst, Alabama
  in Murphy, North Carolina
 WCPZ in Sandusky, Ohio
 WDKL in Mount Clemens, Michigan
 WEBN in Cincinnati, Ohio
 WEGR in Arlington, Tennessee
 WEKX in Jellico, Tennessee
  in Manchester, Vermont
 WGNI in Wilmington, North Carolina
  in New Ellenton, South Carolina
  in Mannington, West Virginia
  in Rockledge, Florida
 WICX-LP in Concord, New Hampshire
 WIEC-LP in Eau Claire, Wisconsin
 WJCF-LP in Doerun, Georgia
  in Macomb, Illinois
  in Appomattox, Virginia
 WJTR-LP in Ashburn, Georgia
 WKBH-FM in La Crescent, Minnesota
  in Williamsport, Pennsylvania
  in Tompkinsville, Kentucky
  in Webster, New York
  in Lewisport, Kentucky
 WLMP-LP in Fredericksburg, Virginia
 WLRB in Ocean City, New Jersey
  in Cape Vincent, New York
  in Marion, Kentucky
  in Pentwater, Michigan
  in Pompano Beach, Florida
 WMYW-LP in Paulding, Ohio
 WNEW-FM in New York, New York
 WNPE in Narragansett Pier, Rhode Island
 WOKH in Springfield, Kentucky
 WOPA-LP in Clio, South Carolina
  in Blountstown, Florida
  in Buckhead, Georgia
  in Camden, South Carolina
  in Baltimore, Maryland
  in Suring, Wisconsin
 WSGF-LP in Bloomingdale, Georgia
 WUFR-LP in Umatilla, Florida
 WUGC-LP in Pelham, Georgia
 WVAZ in Oak Park, Illinois
  in Weber City, Virginia
  in Charleston, West Virginia
 WWFA in St. Florian, Alabama
  in Milton, Florida
  in Madison, Florida
 WXIO-LP in Ridge Manor, Florida
 WYSC in Mcrae, Georgia
  in Morrison, Illinois

United Kingdom
Heart Peterborough  in Peterborough 
BBC Radio Leeds in Keighley, West Yorkshire 
Heart Sussex in Reigate & Crawley 
Radio Skye in Isle of Skye

References

Lists of radio stations by frequency